Bihari Lal Yadav (1857–1926), also referred to as Guru Bihari, was a Bhojpuri writer, poet and singer. He is also known as the founder of the modern Biraha folk genre, this older genre is called Khari Birha. He is also credited to invent a musical instrument, which was a version of  Khartal and introducing it in Bihaha. He wrote Biraha and popularized it in the cities like Benaras and also taught it to his disciples.

Life 
Bihari was born in a Bhojpuriya Ahir family in a village named Patna near Aunrihar town in Ghazipur district of Uttar Pradesh in 1857. He was the only son of his parents. His parent died in very early age and he had to move to Benaras at the age of fourteen in search of job. He permanently resided in Ahiryana near Nichi Bagh. He started performing Biraha in the temples of Benaras. From their he got fame as a poet and singer and then he got four disciples Ramman Yadav, Ganes Yadav, Pattu Yadav and Sarju Rajbhar.

References

1857 births
1926 deaths
Indian poets
Indian singers
Indian writers